The  is an electric multiple unit (EMU) commuter train type operated by the Kyoto Municipal Subway in Kyoto, Japan, since 1997.

Overview 
The 50 series was introduced in 1997 with 14 6-car sets built by the end of 1997 to coincide with the opening of the Tōzai Line. The remaining 18 cars (3 sets) would be built in 2004 for the opening of an extension from Rokujizō Station to Daigo Station.

The trains are smaller than most other trains in the country because of the smaller tunnels carved out during construction.

Interior 
Passenger accommodation consists of longitudinal bench seating throughout. Priority seating and wheelchair space is provided on all vehicles.

Formations 
The six-car trains are formed as follows, with four motored ("M") cars and two non-powered trailer cab ("Tc") cars.

 The "M1" and "M1'" cars are equipped with two pantographs.

Gallery

References

External links 

  

Electric multiple units of Japan
50 Series
Transport in Kyoto
Train-related introductions in 1997
Kinki Sharyo multiple units
1500 V DC multiple units of Japan